Kevin Max Smith (born August 17, 1967) is an American singer, songwriter, and poet. He is best known for being a member of the Christian pop group dc Talk. As a solo artist following the band going on hiatus, he has recorded 12 full-length studio albums, including a Christmas album. From 2012 until 2014, he was the lead singer of the band Audio Adrenaline.

Early life
Adopted as a baby to Max and Elaine Smith, Kevin Smith was raised in Grand Rapids, Michigan. Kevin went to high school at Grand Rapids Baptist (now Northpointe Christian). He went to college at Liberty University in Lynchburg Virginia. Kevin Max Smith legally changed his name to "Kevin Max" in 1997 as a tribute to his adoptive father, Max Smith.

Career

dc Talk years (1989–2001)
While at Liberty University, he met fellow dc Talk bandmates: Toby McKeehan ("tobyMac") and Michael Tait. They formed DC Talk in 1988 and went on to achieve great success in both Christian and mainstream music winning numerous Dove Awards and Grammys. The band went on to win 4 Grammy Awards, 16 GMA Dove Awards, and other recognition. The band went on hiatus in 2000 to pursue solo careers.

Going solo (2001–2012)
Max's first solo album, Stereotype Be, released on August 28, 2001, was praised by Allmusic for "[combining] pop, rock, and world music to create a versatile and intriguing project.". Artists Adrian Belew and Tony Levin of King Crimson, Larry Norman and drummer Matt Chamberlain contributed to the album along with Max's collaborator Erick Cole.  It became a turning point in Max's career, as the project was a foreshadowing of Max's own brand of alternative music.

While Stereotype Be has developed a considerable cult following, it was not well received in the Christian music market. Soon after its release, Max was dropped from his Christian label, Forefront Records. Undeterred, Max began to slowly build his solo career through live shows and word-of-mouth. He released independent albums via his website, including Between the Fence & the Universe and a spoken-word collaboration with Adrian Belew, Raven Songs 101, both in 2004.

In fall of 2004, Max's word-of-mouth strategy finally began to pay off. He played the title role in the Visalia Theatre Company / Hutson-Cavale Productions revival of the classic Tim Rice and Andrew Lloyd Webber musical Joseph and the Amazing Technicolor Dreamcoat. Later that year, he signed a new deal with Northern Records and released a second full-length album, The Imposter on October 11, 2005. He released a Christmas album, Holy Night, in time for the 2005 Christmas season.

In April 2007, Infinity Music announced that Max had been signed to their label for his next project. The Blood was released on December 26, 2007. According to Max, "The Blood is not a classic hymns cover project or a white/homogenized version of black gospel or soul music. It's a sensitive and stylized adaption of the music that was at the root of rock and roll, blues and popular culture."

Max has attempted to create a name for himself apart from DC Talk. While he does not shy away from vocally defending his faith, he has expressed a desire to create art with a universal appeal. He insists, "My music is for a Christian and a Buddhist to pick up and still enjoy, as well as for an atheist. But it is there to prod and ask questions: What is my worldview? What do I believe in, and why do I believe it?"

In February 2008, Max starred in the independent film The Imposter. In the film, Kevin plays a character named "Johnny C", a singer who becomes addicted to OxyContin and loses his family and job as a Christian music star. The movie also features Tom Wright and Troy Baker.

In 2009, Max released Crashing Gates through dPulse records. It was critically praised as returning to his experimental side in the rock and pop genres.

In February 2011, Max formed a supergroup with Broadway singer Tony Vincent and longtime collaborator David Larring. The band was tentatively named "Bad Omens". The three were writing songs when Vincent decided to drop out to pursue theater interests, leaving the new band in a state of pause. A song, "Control", can be heard on Max's SoundCloud.

On February 27, 2012, Max released Fiefdom of Angels-Side One, the first of two albums to coincide with the forthcoming novel series of the same name. The overall project were chosen covers of well known 80's rock songs, with one Kevin Max original and a Muse cover set to lush orchestration. Ology Magazine describes the work as "a new wave mix-tape played at full volume through the Sistine Chapel".

Audio Adrenaline years (2012–2014)
In August 2012, Max became the new lead vocalist in a reunited Audio Adrenaline. He continued with the band until June 2014, when the band opted to take a different creative direction.

Max has also contributed vocally to other artists projects including Mark Heard, Jonathan Thulin, Marc Martel, Michael McDonald, 3kStatic, and many others.

Return to solo career (2014–present)
In late 2014, Max released two singles, "Infinite" and "Light Me Up". On March 10, 2015 the album Broken Temples was released.

In 2015, Max released another studio album of covers of pop standards Starry Eyes Surprise. Max released Playing Games With the Shadow in 2016, Serve Somebody in 2017, and both AWOL and Romeo Drive in 2018.

In 2020, Max released spoken word album Radio Teknika with electronic pioneers 3Kstatic and in the same summer released Revisiting This Planet a tribute to legendary rock artist Larry Norman. Later that year, Max announced a new indie rock band called Sad Astronauts.

In 2022, Max released the album FANTASY with co-production by Old Bear Records, Chris Hoisington. Singles Pure Imagination and David Bowie's As The World Falls Down were also released. 

A Kickstarter campaign was successful in supporting the new album Winter Woods to be released before December 25, 2022. 

In a statement made on his Facebook page, Max announced that he would be creating an album with Father John Misty Bassist, Eli Thomson in the Spring of 2023. Elijah Thomson was also featured on Max's album The Imposter.

Personal life 
In 1997, Max married Alayna Bennett. They divorced in 2003. In April 2005, he married Amanda Lynn MacDonald, but stated in an interview that earlier the two had "a secret wedding and marriage vows were spoken and we had binding agreement together in front of a spiritual leader, but we decided to go with the public ceremony a little bit later." They have four children.    In August 2010, Max and family moved back to Grand Rapids, Michigan. In 2016, Kevin Max bought a farm an hour southwest of Nashville in Centerville, Tennessee, and called it "Blind Thief Farm and Studio". In 2018, the Max family moved to the Westhaven community in Franklin, Tennessee. The Max family frequently tours the states in a Winnebago/Mercedes RV titled Bilbo Waggons. It is estimated that Kevin Max has a net worth of $6 million.

Max became vocal on social media about his politics and spiritual deconstruction in 2019 and 2020 during the pandemic. On the song "Shock Ra" from his 2020 album Radio Teknika, he proclaims himself a "gothic, hippie, inclusive, Jesus freak wanting peace", alongside other political commentary on the album. Politically, Max has identified as both a socialist and an anarchist and expressed support for a number of left-wing causes. By 2021, he specifically identified as an "exvangelical", though he rejected claims that he was no longer a Christian and said that he followed "the Universal Christ".

Discography

With dc Talk
 (1989) DC Talk (Forefront Records)
 (1990) Nu Thang (Forefront Records)
 (1992) Free at Last (Forefront Records)
 (1995) Jesus Freak (Forefront Records)
 (1997) Live in Concert: Welcome to the Freak Show (Forefront Records)
 (1998) Supernatural (Forefront Records)
 (2000) Intermission: the Greatest Hits (Forefront Records)
 (2001) Solo (EP) (Forefront Records)
 (2002) Free at Last: The Movie (Forefront Records)

Solo
Studio albums

Other notable projects
 (1994) At the Foot of Heaven: a Mini Audio Book (spoken word, Starsong)
 (2010) Traveler (Mora Brothers Remixes) (dPulse Recordings)
 (2010) Unholy Triad (dPulse Recordings)
 (2010) Unholy Triad Remix (dPulse Recordings)
 (2015) Same Wavelength (Kevin Max & Service Unicorn) (Blind Thief Recordings)

With Audio Adrenaline
 (2013) Kings & Queens (Fair Trade Services)

Collaborations
 (1995) In the Bleak Mid-Winter from Noel, (as Kevin Smith), produced by Steve Hindalong & Derri Dougherty
 (1996) Lonely Moon (from Strong Hand of Love: A Tribute to Mark Heard)
 (1996) Louie's Solo Petra cover with Passafist, from Never Say Dinosaur)
 (1997) The Canticle of the Plains, (musical written by Rich Mullins)
 (1998) Save Me (from Awesome God: A Tribute to Rich Mullins)
 (1998) Birthday The Beatles cover, from ForeFront Records' Ten: The Birthday Album)
 (1999) There's Something About That Name (with Sonicflood, from Listen Louder)
 (2002) Just an Illusion (from Songs For a Purpose Driven Life, Maranatha! Music)
 (2003, 2009) Raven Songs 101 (collaboration with Adrian Belew, Blind Thief Publishing)
 (2006) Help Me Rhonda (from Making God Smile: An Artists' Tribute to the Songs of Beach Boy Brian Wilson)
 (2006) The Day Is Dawning (with Jill Phillips), from The Prayer Of Jabez...A Worship Experience
 (2007) Blue (feature appearance for Manic Drive, Whiplash Records)
 (2009) Sugar Evolver (with 3kStatic, from Evolver, Sony Music)
 (2010) Come Together Now (Music City Unites for Haiti) (charity single, relief effort led by Michael W. Smith)
 (2011) I Am Second (feature appearance for Newsboys on God's Not Dead, Inpop)
 (2011) A Name, A Day (from "of Shadows and Scars"] with Atlantic
 (2013) Man On Fire (feature appearance for Newsboys on Restart: Deluxe Edition, Inpop)
 (2013) The Living Years (feature appearance for Newsboys on Restart, Inpop)
 (2019) Love One Another (feature appearance for Newsboys on United, Fair Trade)
 (2020) Under Pressure (feature appearance with Marc Martel) 
 (2022) You Did Not Have A Home (from Bellsburg album release) Old Bear Records)

Guest appearances
Marc Martel - "Under Pressure "
 Michael McDonald – "Ain't That Peculiar"
 Audio Adrenaline – "My World View"
 Manic Drive – "Blue"
 Jimmy Abegg – "These Daughters of Mine"
 TobyMac – "Atmosphere (Remix)" on 2004's Welcome to Diverse City
 SONICFLOOd – "Something About That Name"
 Raze – "Forgive Me"
 Newsboys – "God's Not Dead (Like a Lion)", "I Am Second", "Man on Fire", "The Living Years", and "Love One Another"
 Michael Sweet - "This Time" on 2014's I'm Not Your Suicide
 tobyMac – "Love Feels Like" on 2015's This Is Not a Test
 Philippa Hanna – "Embers" on 2016's Speed of Light
 TobyMac – "Space" on 2022's Life After Death

Singles

| rowspan="1"| 2021
| 2021
| "A Pearl To Hide"
| non-album single 
|-
| rowspan='3'| 2022 
| "As The World Falls Down'
| "Pure Imagination" 
| "Coventry Carol" 
|-

Filmography
Music videos
 (2001) Existence (ForeFront Records)
 (2003) Seek (Live) (Northern Records)
 (2010) Carry On My Wayward Son (with Kerry Livgren of Kansas) (Unknown)
 (2015) Moon Over Bourbon Street (Blind Thief Recordings)
 (2016) Girl With the Tiger Eyes (Blind Thief Recordings)
 (2018) Moonracer (Blind Thief Recordings)

Film
 (2010) The Imposter
 (2014) As Dreamers Do

Books
 (1994) At the Foot of Heaven (poetry/artwork, Starsong)
 (2001) Unfinished Work (autobiography, T. Nelson)
 (2002) Slip of the Ink
 (2003) The Detritus of Dorian Gray (poetry, Blind Thief Publishing)
 (2004) Divine Erotica
 (2005) PO/ET/RY (poetry, Blind Thief Publishing)
 (2014) Fiefdom of Angels

See also

dc Talk - Christian Band, 1988-2001 with tobyMac, Kevin Max and Michael Tait
tobyMac - Christian artist of former band dc Talk
Newsboys - Christian band with lead singer Michael Tait (as of 2009)
Adrian Belew - guitarist, producer, frequent collaborator
 Tait - Band of former dcTalk member Michael Tait.

References

External links

 
 NewReleaseTuesday.com Between The Fence And the Universe Interview
 NewReleaseTuesday.com Exclusive The Blood Interview with Kevin Max
 Interview with Kevin Max About The Blood with Wrecked for the Ordinary

1967 births
Living people
American male singer-songwriters
American male poets
DC Talk members
American rock singers
American rock songwriters
American performers of Christian music
Christian writers
Musicians from Grand Rapids, Michigan
Liberty University alumni
Audio Adrenaline members
Former evangelicals
Singer-songwriters from Michigan